The men's 200 metres event at the 1957 World University Games was held at the Stadium Charlety in Paris on 7 and 8 September 1957.

Medalists

Results

Heats

Semifinals

Final

References

Athletics at the 1957 World University Games
1957